Ha'Or Ve'HaTzel ( - The Light and the Shadow) is the second album by the Israeli rapper Subliminal, in collaboration with another Israeli rapper - The Shadow. It was released in 2002.

Track listing

2002 albums
Subliminal (rapper) albums
Albums produced by Ori Shochat